權 may refer to:
Quan, Chinese surname
Kwon, Korean surname
Quyen (name), Vietnamese surname